Giuliano Di Paolo (born in Milan on 27 July 1977), also known as Julio D, is an Italian new media creator, video director, photographer, record producer, singer-songwriter and author. His music includes a wide variety of influences including R&B, jazz, hip hop, synthpop, reggae and afrobeat.

Music career

2011–2013: Sabes Mi Nombre / Better Man 

His debut album Sabes Mi Nombre is published in 2011 by Art Emotion (previously released by INgrooves).

In the first half of 2012, two new singles are published: "Amarte Más" and "Sun Comes Up". These songs don't obtain big consensus. "Yo Te Quiero" came right after. Co-written with songwriter Silvio Cassaro, the track got a lot different. At its debut, the video gained a lot of attention on YouTube.

In March 2013, Better Man was released. Sung in English, Italian and Spanish, the album emphasizes a more focused sound to urban, hip hop and R&B, merged with Afro-Caribbean and zouk rhythms.

2014–2015: Outsider / iNomad 

Outsider, his third album, is announced in 2014. Once again, synth pop, neo soul and afro-urban are mixed in its tracks. "Niente Di Più" is chosen as first single, while "Courage & Faith" is the second tune extracted.

In 2015, he produced a number of videos called iNomad. The aim of the project is to show the recording process of a whole song, in a natural environment, through the use of mobile technologies (already experimented by singer-songwriter Son Pascal).

At the beginning of the same year, the song "Beautiful" is released.

2016–2017: You Can't Stop Us 
In 2016 JD released one new single every two months, which were included in the album "You Can't Stop Us", posted in January 2017. Changing the way usually the album is published and marketed, it's called by the artist evolving album. He explains this is a more contemporary approach to involve public through the LP development, while releasing a new album after a long period of time.

2017–2018: Inner Revolution
Between the end of 2017 and middle 2018, JD published a series of collaborations including Zindy Laursen, Antonia Marquee and Gyr. These songs are included in Inner Revolution, which is an album divided in two EP.

Album

Singles

Cover Songs

Short Films / Visual Arts 

 2020: Viaggiare in Thailandia: Quello che i Turisti Non Vedono
2020: Vita Notturna nella Chinatown Più Grande al Mondo: Yaowarat Bangkok
2020: Mandalay la Perla del Myanmar
2020: Birmania Documentario di Viaggio
2020: Hoi An la Città Magica del Vietnam
2019: Songkran il Water Festival più Grande al Mondo

Books 

 ArtistRevolution – (2018), Art Emotion Publishing
12 Mesi per Cambiare  Vita – (2021), Art Emotion Publishing

See also

 List of singer-songwriters
 List of people from Milan

References

External links
Official Website
Julio D on AllMusic
Julio D on YouTube
Julio D on Spotify

1977 births
21st-century composers
21st-century Italian  male singers
21st-century Italian male writers
English-language singers from Italy
Italian bass guitarists
Italian keyboardists
Italian male singer-songwriters
Italian music video directors
Italian pop singers
Italian record producers
Living people
Male bass guitarists
Pop keyboardists
Rhythm and blues guitarists
Rhythm and blues keyboardists
Italian rhythm and blues singers
Singers from Milan
Spanish-language singers of Italy
20th-century bass guitarists
21st-century guitarists
21st-century bass guitarists